The Baron of Arizona is a 1950 American Western film directed by Samuel Fuller and starring Vincent Price and Ellen Drew.

The film concerns a master forger's attempted use of false documents to lay claim to the territory of Arizona late in the 19th century. It is based on the case of James Reavis, whose scheme came close to success, but many of the film's details are fictionalized.

Plot
The notorious attempt by swindler James Reavis to claim the entire territory of Arizona as his own before it was granted statehood in 1912 is recounted years later by John Griff, who works for the Department of the Interior.

In 1872, Reavis went to great lengths to forge documents in Spain and create the illusion that he had a legal right to claim all of Arizona his own. He began by seeking out Pepito Alvarez to inquire about Sofia, an infant abandoned by Reavis many years before.

Reavis decides to take Sofia home with him, hire governess Loma Morales to refine her, then marry her, using fabricated proof that identifies Sofia as the rightful "baroness" of Arizona. A suspicious U.S. government, unable to disprove Reavis' claim, offers him $25 million for the rights to the land. He declines.

The surveyor general, Miller, is sure Reavis has somehow doctored the documents. He brings in Griff, an expert on forgery. In the meantime, Reavis orders settlers and families off "his" land. A displaced rancher, Lansing, tosses a bomb into Reavis' office. It still does not discourage him, so Pepito finally threatens to reveal that Sofia's parents were not Spanish land barons at all, but native Indians.

Reavis is revealed as a charlatan. He manages to talk his way out of a lynching, but ends up behind bars. After serving time, he is released and reunited with Sofia ala horse carriage in the rain.

Cast
 Vincent Price as James Reavis
 Ellen Drew as Sofia
 Vladimir Sokoloff as Pepito
 Beulah Bondi as Loma
 Reed Hadley as Griff
 Robert Barrat as Judge (as Robert H. Barrat)
 Robin Short as Lansing
 Tina Pine as Rita (as Tina Rome)
 Karen Kester as Sofia as a child
 Margia Dean as the Marquesa
 Jonathan Hale as the Governor
 Edward Keane as Miller
 Barbara Woodell as Mrs. Lansing
 I. Stanford Jolley as Mr. Richardson
 Fred Kohler Jr. as Demmings
 Tristram Coffin as McCleary 
 Gene Roth as Father Guardian
 Angelo Rossitto as Angie – Gypsy (as Angelo Rosito)
 Ed East as Hank 
 Joseph J. Greene as Mr. Gunther (as Joe Greene)

Production and release
Executive producer Robert L. Lippert allocated $100,000 to play the lead. Filming began August 20, 1949. Lippert spent $100,000 to promote the film. The film was shot in 15 days and a print is preserved by the Museum of Modern Art.

The film marks one of the earliest credits for B-Movie director Ed Wood, who worked on stunts. Rudolph Grey's "Nightmare of Ecstasy" states that Ed Wood worked as a stunt double in drag and falls off a moving coach. Having watched the film, the only logical person for him to double for is Ellen Drew in a scene toward the end of the movie, where she and Price are dragged from their coach by an angry mob.

Critical response
Writing in AllMovie, critic Craig Butler praised the performances of Price and Drew, described the film as "a bizarre but intriguing little Western" with "unconvincing reversals and some sequences which come across as a tad farfetched," and concluded that "portions of the film drag in places due to forced exposition [but] the verve of the other sections makes up for it." Novelist and comic book writer Jamie S. Rich wrote in DVD Talk that in this film Fuller "struggl[ed] with melodramatic story structure" but "definitely has a better handle on his material and a stronger visual sense than he had on his first feature (I Shot Jesse James)," concluding that the film was a "middling effort."

References

External links
 
 
 
 
  on Criterion Collection

1950 films
1950 Western (genre) films
1950s historical films
American Western (genre) films
American black-and-white films
American historical films
Biographical films about people of the American Old West
Films directed by Samuel Fuller
Films scored by Paul Dunlap
Films set in Arizona
Films set in the 1870s
Films set in the 1880s
Films set in the 1890s
Films set in the 1910s
Lippert Pictures films
1950s English-language films
1950s American films